London Samurai Rovers Football Club is a football club based in Hanworth, London, England.

History
London Samurai United, a club formed for the Japanese diaspora in London, were formed in 2017, being placed in the Middlesex County League Division One. A year later, the club merged with JL Rovers, renaming themselves to London Samurai Rovers, stepping up to the Premier Division. In 2021, the club was admitted into the Combined Counties League Division One.

Ground
The club played at Twyford Avenue Sports Ground in Acton during their time in the Middlesex County League. In July 2021, London Samurai Rovers announced they would be groundsharing with Hanworth Villa at Rectory Meadow for the upcoming season.

References

Association football clubs established in 2017
2017 establishments in England
Football clubs in England
Football clubs in London
Japanese diaspora in the United Kingdom
Sport in the London Borough of Ealing
Sport in the London Borough of Hounslow
Diaspora sports clubs in the United Kingdom
Middlesex County Football League
Combined Counties Football League
Diaspora association football clubs in England